The Goyang Foreign Language High School is a secondary school in Gyeonggi-do, Gwansan-dong, South Korea. It opened in March 2002.

Goyang School focuses on preparing students for study abroad, and emphasizes language study in English, Chinese, Japanese, and Spanish. All students major in one offered language. The school also provides international study opportunities to prepare for exams such as the SAT, AP, and the TOEFL.

Extracurricular Activities 
Goyang School offers several extracurricular activities, including:

 Model United Nations (GYMUN)
 Newspaper Goyang (NG)
 Goyang Herald (English-language student paper)
 Physics in Daily Life (생활속의 물리부)
 Goyang Debate Society (GDS) (English-language)
 Math Club (BTM)

External links
 Goyang Foreign Language High School official homepage (Korean) 

Goyang
Language high schools in South Korea
Educational institutions established in 2002
2002 establishments in South Korea